The women's 200 m individual medley swimming events for the 2016 Summer Paralympics take place at the Rio Olympic Stadium from 10 to 17 September. A total of nine events are contested for nine different classifications.

Competition format
Each event consists of two rounds: heats and final. The top eight swimmers overall in the heats progress to the final. If there are less than eight swimmers in an event, no heats are held and all swimmers qualify for the final.

Results

SM5

The SM5 event took place on 15 September.

SM6

The SM6 event took place on 12 September.

SM7

The SM7 event took place on 13 September.

SM8

The SM8 event took place on 17 September.

SM9

The SM9 event took place on 11 September.

SM10

The SM10 event took place on 11 September.

SM11

The SM11 event took place on 16 September.

SM13

The SM13 event took place on 10 September.

SM14

The SM14 event took place on 17 September.

References

Swimming at the 2016 Summer Paralympics